Lawrence Raab (born 1946, in Pittsfield, Massachusetts) is an American poet.

Life
Raab graduated from Middlebury College in 1968, and from Syracuse University with an MA in 1972.
He taught at American University (1970 to 71), University of Michigan, and Williams College (1976 to present). His work has appeared in The New Yorker  and the Virginia Quarterly Review.
He lives in Williamstown, Massachusetts.

Awards
 1992 National Poetry Series, for What we don't know about each other
 2007 Guggenheim Fellowship

Poetry collection

References

External links
"Marriage", Poetry, November 1990
"Cold Spring", Poetry Foundation
"Camouflage", Virginia Quarterly Review, Winter 2003 
"Saint George’s Dragon", Virginia Quarterly Review, Winter 2003 
"A Night’s Museum", Virginia Quarterly Review, Autumn 1977 
 Audio: Lawrence Raab reads Two Riddles from The Word Exchange: Anglo-Saxon Poems in Translation
 A series of correspondence between poet Lawrence Raab and novelist Jonathan Baumbach for InDigest
 Lawrence Raab papers at Williams College Archives & Special Collections

1946 births
Living people
American male poets
University of Michigan faculty